Ian Robert Brown (born 14 August 1965) is a former freestyle swimmer who twice represented Australia at the Summer Olympics. He made his debut in 1988. His best Olympic result was the fifth place, four years later in Barcelona, Spain, in the men's 400 m freestyle.

See also
 List of Commonwealth Games medallists in swimming (men)

References
 Australian Olympic Committee

1965 births
Living people
Australian male freestyle swimmers
Olympic swimmers of Australia
Swimmers at the 1988 Summer Olympics
Swimmers at the 1992 Summer Olympics
Swimmers at the 1990 Commonwealth Games
Commonwealth Games medallists in swimming
Commonwealth Games gold medallists for Australia
Commonwealth Games silver medallists for Australia
20th-century Australian people
Medallists at the 1990 Commonwealth Games